Sir Thomas Wardlaw Taylor (March 25, 1833 – March 2, 1917) was a Canadian lawyer and judge.

Born in Auchtermuchty, Scotland, he studied at Edinburgh University, and was admitted to the Upper Canadian bar in 1858.  From 1872 to 1883 he was Master of Chancery, and from 1883 to 1887 puisne judge of the Manitoba Court of Queen's Bench. He was the presiding judge at the 1885 trial of Manitoba Métis leader Louis Riel.

From 1887 to 1899 Taylor was Chief Justice of Manitoba, and in 1890 and 1893 was administrator of the provincial government.  He made an extensive study of equity jurisprudence, on which subject he published a volume of Commentaries (1875).  He was the author of Chancery Statutes and Orders and The Public Statutes Relating to the Presbyterian Church, and more.

He was knighted in the 1897 Diamond Jubilee Honours.

He is commemorated by Wardlaw Avenue in Winnipeg.

Notes

References 
 
 

1833 births
1917 deaths
People from Auchtermuchty
Alumni of the University of Edinburgh
Canadian legal writers
Judges in Manitoba
Lawyers in Manitoba
Canadian Knights Bachelor

Scottish emigrants to Canada